2010-11 Moldovan Cup is the 20th season of the Moldovan annual football tournament. The competition started in September 2010 with the first round and will end with the final held on May 26, 2011.

First round
In this round enter teams from lower divisions "A" Division and "B" Division. They will play against 6 winner teams from the second preliminary round.
The draw took place September 14, 2010. The round matches are scheduled to be played September 15, 2010, unless otherwise noted.

Second round
In this round entered 6 teams from the National Division. These matches were played on 22 September 2010.

|}

Third round
In this round entered the eight winners from the previous round and the remaining eight teams from the National Division. These matches were played on 27 October 2010.

|}

Quarterfinals
This round featured the eight winners from the previous round and was played over two legs. The first legs were played on 10 November 2010 and the second legs were played on 24 November 2010.

|}

Semifinals
This round featured the four winners from the previous round and was played over two legs. The first legs were played on 19 April 2011 and the second legs were played on 3 May 2011.
An interesting fact is that the semifinals pairs are exactly those that were played in the previous edition of the Moldovan Cup.

|}

Final

Top goalscorers
Updated to matches played on 19 May 2013.

References

Moldovan Cup seasons
Moldovan Cup 2010-11
Moldova